Tambuwal is a Local Government Area in Sokoto State, Nigeria.

It has an area of 1,717 km and a population of 224,931 at the 2006 census.
  
The postal code of the area is 850.

References

Local Government Areas in Sokoto State